Whynot may refer to:

 Whynot, Mississippi, U.S.
 Whynot, North Carolina, U.S.
 Whynot Records, a Japanese jazz record label
 WhyNot Jazz Room, a jazz club in New York City

People with the surname
 John Whynot, Canadian musician, producer, and composer

See also
 Why Not (disambiguation)
 Wynot, Nebraska